This is a list of prefects of Šibenik-Knin County.

Prefects of Šibenik County (1993–1997)

Prefects of Šibenik-Knin County (1997–present)

See also
Šibenik-Knin County

References

External links
World Statesmen - Šibenik-Knin County

Šibenik-Knin County